Denis Yur'yevich Sadovsky (born 11 August 1997) is a Belarusian professional footballer. He plays for Dinamo Brest.

Club career
On 20 January 2022, he returned to Belarus and signed a two-year contract with Gomel.

Honours
Shakhtyor Soligorsk
Belarusian Cup winner: 2018–19

Gomel
Belarusian Cup winner: 2021–22

References

External links 
 
 

1997 births
Sportspeople from Vitebsk
Living people
Belarusian footballers
Association football goalkeepers
FC Shakhtyor Soligorsk players
FC Orsha players
FC Energetik-BGU Minsk players
FC Tom Tomsk players
FC Gomel players
FC Dynamo Brest players
Belarusian Premier League players
Belarusian First League players
Russian First League players
Belarusian expatriate footballers
Expatriate footballers in Russia
Belarusian expatriate sportspeople in Russia